"Baraye" (lit. "For" or "Because of") is a power ballad by Iranian singer-songwriter Shervin Hajipour inspired by the death of Mahsa Amini and its aftermath.  Widely referred to as "the anthem of the protests," Baraye received huge critical acclaim for its vocals and portrayal of the emotions of the Iranian people all around the world. At the 65th Annual Grammy Awards the song won the first-ever special merit award for Best Song for Social Change.

Production

Background
The song was inspired by the death of a 22-year-old Iranian woman named Mahsa Amini, who was arrested for alleged wearing her Hijab improperly and died in police custody after according to eyewitnesses, she had been severely beaten by religious morality police officers. Amini's death sparked massive global protests and became a symbol for freedom in Iran. The "Woman, Life, Freedom" slogan (which was used in the song) became a rallying cry during the protests.

Lyrics and composition

After the death of Mahsa Amini and the start of the protests, an Internet meme was spread through the social media (and Twitter in particular), by which (through phrases starting with the word "for") the users explained their personal reasons for protesting and wishing for regime change in Iran.

Trying to capture the essence of these sentiments, Hajipour wrote each verse of the lyrics based on a separate tweet. The resulting text touches upon several topics in need of change, including: low life satisfaction, women's rights, children's rights, the rights of refugees,  animals rights, environmental concerns, recession and poverty, theocracy and outdated social and religious taboos, militarism and political corruption, local corruption, freedom of speech, and the government's hostility against other countries.

Music video
The music video was recorded with a stationary camera in a portrait-selfie style in a room. In the video, cropped screenshots depicting the original tweets are synced with the associated verses, crediting the authors.

Release and Hajipour's arrest
The song was first released on September 28, 2022, on Shervin Hajipour's Instagram account and it was taken down from the platform in less than 48 hours following Hajipour's arrest by the authorities on September 29. It received about 40 million views In less than 48 hours.

Hajipour was forced to remove the song from his social media platforms by the Islamic Revolutionary Guard Corps's security agents shortly after his arrest. The arrest sparked reactions internationally.

Posting the phrase "Hey, Ayatollah, leave them kids alone" in uppercase with exclamation marks, Roger Waters retweeted the song's music video.

On October 4, 2022, Hajipour was released on bail "so that his case can go through the legal process," according to Mohammad Karimi, prosecutor of the northern province of Mazandaran.

Critical reception

Grammy Award win
On October 10, 2022, Variety reported that the protest song received nearly 100,000 submissions for a new category at the coming Grammy Awards.
Answering to a Billboard question about the meaning of a Grammy for Baraye for the Iranians, Iranian American Grammy winning electronic musician and producer Dubfire said that it "will undoubtedly embolden the revolutionaries in Iran."

On February 5, 2023, Baraye became the first song ever to be awarded with a Grammy for Best Song for Social Change. The award was presented by Jill Biden in absence of Hajipour.

In response to his win, and after months of silence, Hajipour posted on his Instagram account "We won."

Year-end listings
 Slate'''s Carl Wilson dozen picks of the best songs of 2022.
 100 best songs of the 2022 by the staff of Billboard - No. 50.
 Selected as preposition of the year by Language on the Move's Ingrid Piller.
 Linkiesta's the "Thirty-Four Best Albums of 2022 Plus Two Formidable Songs" by Christian Rocca.
 KCRW's 30 best songs of 2022.
 Musikhjälpen 2022's most requested song.
 Accolades 
 Grammy Award for Best Song for Social Change.

Impact
Upon its release, "Baraye" became an instant hit and immediately turned into the unofficial anthem of the uprising. It was widely used during gatherings, from schools and universities to streets, both nationwide and across the globe. It was broadly circulated in social media and foreign TV channels and radio stations as well. The song also served as the backdrop for several other forms of art such as video works, graphic design and performance art. On November 11, 2022, Roxana Saberi reported the song as "the most viral tune to ever come out of Iran". Since its release, Baraye has become the single most covered protest song in Iran's history.

AcademiaBaraye was played for solidarity in several events and performances at universities outside of Iran such as University of Waterloo, Yale School of Medicine, UW-Milwaukee, Chalmers University of Technology, University of Rochester, Ruhr University Bochum, Technical University of Braunschweig, Gatton Student Center of University of Kentucky and Nuremberg University of Music.

Politics and activism
 During the November 8, 2022 debate in the UK Parliament, MP Rushanara Ali quoted the verse "for my sister, your sister, our sisters" to highlight the importance of the women's right in the protests, to ask Under-Secretary David Rutley  whether the UK Government would support expelling of Iran from the UN Commission on the Status of Women. In response, Rutley called the points of the question the "grassroots nature" of the uprising and reassured that, while the UK is "taking strong action against the Iranians," these points will be raised with Lord Ahmad, the Minister for the Middle East.
 At the October 5, 2022 debate held by France's Senate for the "attacks on the women's rights and the human rights in Iran", Senator Mélanie Vogel ended her speech by playing Baraye. Nathalie Goulet, another member of the Senate also used the song in her solidarity video with the uprising.
 To give "voice to brave Iranians" Senator Ratna Omidvar read an English translation of the song at the Senate of Canada on November 3, 2022. She opened her statement by saying:

 Nobel Peace Prize Laureate Malala Yousafzai, used the song as the background for her video of solidarity with the Iranian women.
 US secretary of state Antony Blinken listed the song on his Spotify playlist for 2022 On the Road songs.

Sports
 Prior to and after the match between England and Iran in 2022 FIFA World Cup Baraye was frequently played outside Khalifa International Stadium bringing the Iranians together to show solidarity with people inside Iran.
 On November 4, 2022, Iranian bodybuilder Saeed Noruzi chose Baraye as his posing music while competing in classic physique division of a competition organized by the Austrian Bodybuilding & Physique Sports Federation (ABPF). He finished second in the final results.

 The song is the background music of the solidarity video published by the Landesliga Niederrhein football club Holzheimer SG.

Cinema and television

 On November 7, Hanna Sökelandthe the star of the German TV show Princess Charming published a video highlighted by the song Baraye, in which she shaves her hair in solidarity with the uprising.
 The special episode of Die Anstalt dedicated to the Iranian people with Negah Amiri and Enissa Amani as guests was ended with Baraye.
 Baraye is the background music in a video backed by Olivia Colman and Nazanin Boniadi in which celebrities such as Brian Cox and Kate Beckinsale as well as a number of Iranian artists spoke out on the death of Mahsa Amini.

Fashion

 Haider Ackermann, the designer of Jean Paul Gaultier's collection for spring/summer 2023 couture, selected the song for the show at Paris Fashion Week on January 25.

Covers and performances
The song was covered by several artists and entities including Shelley Segal, Ana Alcaide and Malmö Opera and in different languages such as Italian, German, English, Spanish and French.

 On October 29, 2022 Baraye was performed by Coldplay in their concert at Estadio River Plate in Buenos Aires and it was simultaneously aired live in 3,400 cinemas across 81 countries. Before inviting Golshifteh Farahani on stage to provide support with the vocals, Chris Martin, the band lead, said: 

 Carola Häggkvist performed a Swedish version on Sveriges Television.
 On November 4, 2022, Rana Mansour was invited by ProSiebenSat.1 to perform her version of the song on the finale of 12th season of The Voice of Germany, in solidarity with the Iranian protesters. After a standing ovation which lasted for nearly 2 minutes, Mansour took a moment to draw attentions to the political arrest of the Iranian rapper Toomaj Salehi in Iran.
 On 30th anniversary of the Arsch huh, Zäng ussenander campaign, which was held on November 10, 2022, the song was performed by Iranian singer Sogand. The event was broadcast live on WDR.
 At the Kraftklub Hamburg concert on 15 November 2022 (which was held after a four-year band break), Iranian-German singer Maryam.fyi was invited on the stage to perform her cover. Maryam.fyi also performed the song together with Nico Santos at 2022 1LIVE Krone music awards.
 On November 2, 2022, 50 French personalities gathered by Marjane Satrapi performed the song in Persian. The music was arranged by Benjamin Biolay and its video contained scenes of Satrapi's highly acclaimed animated movie, Persepolis. The participating figures include Chiara Mastroianni and  Irène Jacob.
 During an installation called Eyes on Iran held on Roosevelt Island, Jon Batiste played a rendition of Baraye.
 On December 28, 2022, Samara Bahrami performed the song during TV 2's De Største Øjeblikke.

 As of February 6, 2023, Taylor Hanson is working on a cover version of Baraye with a massive choir of 16 thousand people each representing one political prisoner arrested since the start of the protests. The choir produces the voice for the chorus baraye azadi (for freedom).

Other impactsBaraye has drawn widespread attention to the critical status of some of the themes in the lyrics such as the situation of the Afghan refugees in Iran, trees of Valiasr Street and the Asiatic cheetah (and Pirouz in particular). Sadly, Pirouz died due to kidney failure in Tehran's Central Veterinary Hospital on February 28, 2023.

Analysis and views
 In an article published by the Los Angeles Times on October 12, 2022, it is explored how the song "became an anthem for the women, freedom and an ordinary life". In it, Nahid Siamdoust of University of Texas and the author of Soundtrack of the Revolution: The Politics of Music in Iran compares the use of songs in past protests with that of Baraye in the uprising it was written in, and states that "no other uprising has had such a singular anthem" and that it is a song vocalized by one musician, but "written by people at large". She also writes in her article for Foreign Policy:

 In an interview on NPR hosted by Leila Fadel, the American singer and songwriter Maimouna Youssef describes the song as the "voice to the voiceless" and unstoppable like a "wildfire" adding:

 In his essay How Listening to Music Affects Your Mood posted by Psychology Today, Shahram Heshmat, an associate professor at the University of Illinois, takes Baraye as an example which shows that music can "reflect the mood on a national level" and that in this context, "Baraye expresses Iranians' painful grievances".
 Sussan Tahmasebi explains to Chris Hayes on his MSNBC podcast Why Is This Happening that the song "talks about people's aspirations."
 In the conclusion of Fintan O'Toole's talk at Tanner Lectures on Human Values, referring to the use of Baraye in the Iranian protests, Wendy Brown disputes O'Toole's argument maintaining that the revolutionary potential of art outweighs its fascistic potential.
 In an interview with Lina Attalah done for the Egyptian newspaper Mada Masr, Fatemeh Sadeghi, Research Associate at the UCL Institute for Global Prosperity explains the reason for the popularity of Baraye:

 The German-Persian social scientist Naika Foroutan called the song "the sound of a whole era".
 In an interview with Billboard, Snoh Aalegra said about the song:

 In an analysis in Foreign Policy, Holly Dagres calls the song "the Gen Z anthem" and with reference to the lyrics she writes that "The needs and wants of the protesters were as simple as that but threatening enough for authorities to arrest Hajipour...":
 Karim Sadjadpour, a fellow at the Carnegie Endowment for International Peace told The Christian Science Monitor: "The single best way to understand Iran's uprising is not any book or essay, but Shervin Hajipour's ... "Baraye". Its profundity requires multiple views."
 Nick Warner suggests that if one wants to know "what is fueling the protests" they must listen to "the lyrics of the haunting unofficial anthem of the demonstrators in" Baraye''.

See also
 O Iran!
 Woman's Anthem
 Human rights in the Islamic Republic of Iran
 Iran student protests, July 1999
 2009 Iranian university dormitory raids
 2009 Iranian presidential election protests
 2017–2021 Iranian protests
 Bloody November

References

Mahsa Amini protests
Protest songs
Songs about freedom
2022 songs
2022 singles
Songs based on actual events